The Massachusetts Wing Civil Air Patrol (abbreviated MAWG), commonly referred to as "Mass Wing", is the highest echelon of Civil Air Patrol (CAP) in the Commonwealth of Massachusetts. Its headquarters is located at Hanscom Air Force Base in Bedford, Massachusetts. MA Wing reports to Northeast Region CAP, which reports to CAP National Headquarters.

Emergency services
Training for all Emergency Services functions is based on the Incident Command System.  The most basic qualifications require certification in the ICS-100 course available online.

Members of the wing assisted in the search for John F. Kennedy, Jr.'s plane crash site. More recently, a few Massachusetts Wing members aided with Incident Command at the Gulf Oil Spill Disaster.

In April 2020, members of the Massachusetts Wing began assisting the Massachusetts Emergency Management Agency (MEMA) in its response to the COVID-19 pandemic by helping to load and unload trucks, inventorying personal protective equipment and other needed medical supplies, and assembling orders of those items for delivery to local municipalities around the state.

Aerospace Education
Aerospace Education includes a monthly aerospace education class, up to 7 Orientation Flights for Cadets under 18, and a display competition based on the STEM principles which is judged at the annual Conference.

Cadet Program
The Cadet Program culminates each summer in an encampment. In recent years, encampments have been held at Joint Base Cape Cod, normally in the month of August.

Massachusetts Wing has credit for 18 Spaatz-earning Cadets.

Squadrons
At one time, Massachusetts Wing oversaw approximately 25 primary subordinate squadrons under 4 groups located throughout the state, however the groups were eliminated when the number of squadrons dwindled below the 20 required to justify their existence.  To date, there are currently 12 Active Squadrons in the Massachusetts Wing.

Beverly Composite Squadron MA-019
Boston Cadet Squadron MA-002
Bridgewater State University Squadron MA-005
Coastal Patrol 18 Composite Squadron MA-044
Essex County Composite Squadron MA-070
Brigadier General Arthur J. Pierce Squadron MA-013
Goddard Cadet Squadron MA-007
Hanscom Composite Squadron MA-043
Lt Col. Frank Pocher Minute Man Squadron MA-059
Pilgrim Composite Squadron MA-071
Westover Composite Squadron MA-015
Worcester Cadet Squadron MA-022

References

External links 
 Massachusetts Wing Civil Air Patrol

Wings of the Civil Air Patrol
Military units and formations in Massachusetts